The NRL Women's Premiership Grand Final is the championship-deciding game of women's rugby league's NRL Women's Premiership competition.

History
After the formation of the Women's NRL League in 2018 it was announced that the title would be decided by a playoff series and Grand Final as the men's competition does as well. The first two Grand Finals were held at the ANZ Stadium on the same day and before the men's Grand Final.

Trophy and awards

Premiership rings
The NRL present premiership rings for the players and coach of grand final winning sides. Affinity Diamonds have produced the NRL Women's premiership rings

Prize money
Prize money is awarded to the victorious club.

However the amount is probably not reflective of the magnitude of participating in the event. It is often assumed simply that the winner of the premiership typically experiences an increase in revenue through increases in membership and merchandise sales.

Grand Finals

See also

NRL Grand Final
RFL Women's Super League Grand Final

References

External links

NRL Women's Premiership
2018 establishments in Australia
Rugby league club matches
Grand finals
Recurring sporting events established in 2018